Phialella zappai is a species of cnidarian in the family Phialellidae. It was named for musician Frank Zappa by Ferdinando "Nando" Boero, a jellyfish expert from Genova, Italy who wrote to Zappa hoping to meet the musician whom he admired. Zappa replied saying "there is nothing I would like better than having a jellyfish with my name", leading to a meeting and eventually a friendly acquaintance between the biologist and the musician.

See also
List of organisms named after famous people (born 1900–1949)

References

Phialellidae
Animals described in 1987
Frank Zappa